DR P8 Jazz is one of DR's digital radio stations in Denmark. It launched on 12 September 2011 as the fourth of five new digital-only stations.

History 
In November 2010, DR announced it would significantly lower the number of digital radio stations in its line-up from 23 to between 10-12. The new line-up of digital stations were announced in January 2011 with P8 Jazz replacing the former DR Jazz. Unlike DR Jazz which played jazz non-stop, P8 Jazz were to have presenters.

On 1 October 2017 P8 Jazz became available on DAB+ radio when a nationwide switch-over took place.

Notes

Radio stations in Denmark
Radio stations established in 2011